Rubén Umpiérrez (born 25 October 1956) is an Uruguayan footballer who played for CA Cerro in Uruguay, and AS Nancy, Racing Paris and US Créteil-Lusitanos in France. He won the Etoile d'Or award for most regular player of the season in 1984–85.

Umpierrez also enjoyed a short spell as a manager with US Créteil-Lusitanos in 1989.

He is the uncle of referee Claudia Umpiérrez.

References

1956 births
Living people
Uruguayan footballers
C.A. Cerro players
AS Nancy Lorraine players
Racing Club de France Football players
US Créteil-Lusitanos players
Ligue 1 players
Ligue 2 players
Expatriate footballers in France
Uruguayan football managers
US Créteil-Lusitanos managers
Association football midfielders